Pa Kam may refer to:
 Pa Kam-e Bala
 Pa Kam-e Pain